Victor Rodman (born Victor Rottman, August 6, 1892–June 29, 1965) was an American actor best known for his work on two Jack Webb NBC television programs, Dragnet and Noah's Ark.

Biography
Rodman was born in Augusta, Arkansas. Named after his farmer father who was a Hungarian immigrant, he began acting in silent film shorts as early as 1914 and continued in that genre until 1925. During the 1930s and 1940s, he acted in radio dramas such as "Speed Gibson" and "This Is Your FBI".  He performed as Dr. Kingsley in "Speed Gibson" and assumed various parts in the FBI series.

After a 30-year absence from the screen, Rodman appeared from 1953 to 1957 on eight episodes of Dragnet. In 1955, he guest starred in the syndicated series, I Led Three Lives, based on the exploits of communist infiltrator Herbert Philbrick. He played Comrade Arthur in the episode "Commie Dies." Thereafter, he joined the cast of Noah's Ark, which ran for twenty-four episodes. During this 1956–1957 series, he played an older veterinarian, Dr. Sam Rinehart, who uses a wheelchair. Paul Burke portrayed the younger colleague and title character, Dr. Noah McCann. May Wynn starred as the young clinic receptionist, Liz Clark.

In 1958, Rodman guest starred in the role of Rufe Teller in the episode "Drop to Drink" of CBS's Wanted Dead or Alive, a western starring future screen star Steve McQueen. In 1959, he appeared in the episode "Devil's Acre" of the syndicated western, Man Without a Gun.

In 1959, Rodman also played a nightwatchman on an episode of CBS' Perry Mason starring Raymond Burr, called “The Case of the Bartered Bikini”. In 1960, Rodman guest starred as a judge on the episode "A Tender Touch" of the Craig Stevens detective series, Peter Gunn. Just prior to his death, Rodman's last role was uncredited as a prison inmate in the film Brainstorm, directed by William Conrad.

Rodman died at the age of seventy-two in Los Angeles, California. Internet references do not give Rodman's place of birth, family information, other occupations, or burial site.

References

American male television actors
American male film actors
Male actors from Los Angeles
1892 births
1965 deaths
People from Augusta, Arkansas
20th-century American male actors